"Let Me Let Go" is a song written by Steve Diamond and Dennis Morgan and performed by American country music singer Faith Hill. It was released on September 14, 1998, as the third single from Hill's third studio album, Faith (1998). The song features background vocals from Vince Gill.

History
"Let Me Let Go" was also remixed into a pop version and used as the soundtrack for the movie Message in a Bottle. The remix was also added to the international album Love Will Always Win and the compilation album There You'll Be. The song was nominated for a Grammy for Best Female Country Vocal Performance; Hill performed the remix version of the song at the 2000 Grammy Awards ceremony. The footage of the performance was released on the DVD Grammy's Greatest Moments later that year.

In 2000, saxophonist Michael Lington covered the song from his album, Vivid.

Critical reception
The song received a positive review in Billboard, which said, "Let Me Let Go" is a well-written song about moving on after a failed relationship, and Hill's intimate, vulnerable vocal illustrates why she's one of the genre's top female talents. The fact that her voice is combined with Vince Gill's lush, lovely backing harmonies elevates this record to heavenly heights. The production by Hill and Dan Huff is a little more pop-driven than on her previous ballads, but radio seems to be firmly behind this deserving artist, and are willing to stretch with her."

Charts

Weekly charts

Year-end charts

Release history

References

1998 singles
1998 songs
Faith Hill songs
Song recordings produced by Dann Huff
Songs written by Dennis Morgan (songwriter)
Songs written by Steve Diamond (songwriter)
Warner Records singles